The Green Bowl (グリーンボウル) is the final game of an annual American football tournament played in Japan, during spring, between members of the X-League from western Japan.

Game results

References

American football in Japan
Annual sporting events in Japan